Reya may refer to:
Reya (caste), a Hindu caste
Reya, a synonym of Burchardia, a genus of herbs endemic to Australia
Reya, a diminutive of the Russian female first name Avreya
Ivrin Reya Osathanond, real name of Charm Osathanond (b. 1987), Thai actress, model, and host
Reya, Soviet radar copied by the Chinese as the Type 351 Radar